Sergei Zenjov (born 20 April 1989) is an Estonian professional footballer who plays as a forward for Estonian club Flora and the Estonia national team. Besides Estonia, Zenjov has played in England, Ukraine, Russia, Poland, Azerbaijan and Kazakhstan.

Club career

Pärnu
Zenjov began playing football for a local club Pärnu, where he was coached by Juri Ivanov. He made his senior league debut in the II liiga with Pärnu Pataljon in 2005. Zenjov made his debut in the Meistriliiga on 8 March 2006, playing for Vaprus, and scored his side's only goal in a 1–3 away loss to TVMK.

TVMK
In July 2006, Zenjov signed for Meistriliiga club TVMK. He made his debut for the club on 23 July, in a 1–3 away loss to Levadia.

Karpaty Lviv
In February 2008, Zenjov signed a five-year contract with Vyshcha Liha club Karpaty Lviv. He made his debut in the Vyshcha Liha on 1 March 2008, in a 1–0 home victory over Kharkiv. On 27 July 2008, Zenjov scored his first goal for Karpaty Lviv in a 1–1 home draw against Shakhtar Donetsk.

Zenjov scored two goals in the qualification for the 2010–11 UEFA Europa League. He made his debut in the Europa League on 16 September 2010, in a 3–4 home loss to Borussia Dortmund.

Blackpool
On 3 July 2014, Zenjov signed a one-year contract with Championship club Blackpool. He made his debut for the club on 9 August, starting in a 0–2 away loss to Nottingham Forest. On 2 December 2014, Zenjov left Blackpool after a mutual agreement was reached to terminate his contract.

Torpedo Moscow
After leaving Blackpool, Zenjov signed a two-and-a-half-year contract with Russian Premier League club Torpedo Moscow on 12 January 2015. He made his debut in the Russian Premier League on 9 March 2015, in a 0–0 away draw against Amkar Perm.

Gabala
On 16 June 2015, Zenjov joined Azerbaijan Premier League club Gabala on a two-year contract. He made his debut for the club on 2 July 2015, in a 1–2 first leg defeat of their Europa League qualifier against Dinamo Tbilisi. On 19 March 2016, Zenjov scored Gabala's 500th goal in a 1–2 away loss to Qarabağ.

Cracovia
On 27 June 2017, Zenjov signed a one-year contract with Ekstraklasa club Cracovia. He made his debut in the Ekstraklasa on 15 July 2017, in Cracovia's first match of the 2017–18 season, and scored in the 1–1 home draw against Piast Gliwice.

International
Zenjov began his youth career in 2005 with the Estonia under-17 team. He also represented the under-19 and under-21 national sides.

Zenjov made his senior international debut for Estonia on 20 August 2008, in a 2–1 home win over Malta in a friendly. He scored his first international goal in his second match for the national team on 6 September 2008, in a 2–3 away loss to Belgium in a qualification match for the 2010 FIFA World Cup.

On 23 September 2022, he played his 100th match for Estonia in the Nations League game against Malta.

Career statistics

Club

International

International goals
As of 10 January 2023. Estonia score listed first, score column indicates score after each Zenjov goal.

Honours
Individual
Estonian Young Footballer of the Year: 2008, 2010

References

External links

1989 births
Living people
Sportspeople from Pärnu
Estonian footballers
Estonian people of Russian descent
Association football forwards
Meistriliiga players
Pärnu JK Vaprus players
FC TVMK players
Ukrainian Premier League players
FC Karpaty Lviv players
English Football League players
Blackpool F.C. players
Russian Premier League players
FC Torpedo Moscow players
Azerbaijan Premier League players
Gabala FC players
Ekstraklasa players
MKS Cracovia (football) players
FC Shakhter Karagandy players
Estonia youth international footballers
Estonia under-21 international footballers
Estonia international footballers
Estonian expatriate footballers
Estonian expatriate sportspeople in Ukraine
Expatriate footballers in Ukraine
Estonian expatriate sportspeople in England
Expatriate footballers in England
Estonian expatriate sportspeople in Russia
Expatriate footballers in Russia
Estonian expatriate sportspeople in Azerbaijan
Expatriate footballers in Azerbaijan
Estonian expatriate sportspeople in Poland
Expatriate footballers in Poland
Estonian expatriate sportspeople in Kazakhstan
Expatriate footballers in Kazakhstan
FIFA Century Club